Richard K. Gershon (24 December 1932 – 11 July 1983) was an American immunologist and pathologist, and professor at Yale School of Medicine.

Biography 
He graduated from Harvard University in 1954, and was noted for his work on tumor biology and viral hepatitis.

In 1980, he was made a member of the National Academy of Sciences.

At Yale, among others, he collaborated with Włodzimierz Ptak, who recalled Gershon as a true friend and one of the most intellectually related and valued people.

He died of lung cancer.

Awards 
 Gairdner Foundation International Award (1983)
 William B. Coley Award (1983)

References 

American immunologists
American pathologists
Harvard University alumni
Yale School of Medicine faculty
Members of the United States National Academy of Sciences
Deaths from lung cancer
1932 births
1983 deaths